

Recruits 
The following is a list of commitments Milwaukee received for the 2008–09 season:

 Riley Walker
 James Eayrs
 Tone Boyle
 Tony Meier
 Burleigh Porte
 Ryan Haggerty
 Patrick Souter
 Jerard Ajami
 James Dean

Roster

Coaching staff

Schedule

Player stats 
Updated as of March 20, 2009.Showing only the Top 5 statistic leaders.

2009 Horizon League Tournament 

First round games at campus sites of higher seeds
Second round and semifinals will be hosted by Butler.
Championship will be hosted by higher-numbered remaining seed

References 

Milwaukee Panthers
Milwaukee Panthers men's basketball seasons